Frog and Toad Together is an American fantasy adventure children's picture book, written and illustrated by Arnold Lobel and published by Harper & Row in 1972. It is the second book in the Frog and Toad series. Like each of the other books in the series, it contains five easy-to-read short stories.

Summaries

A List 
Toad writes a list of activities for himself and Frog for the day. However, when the list is lost during a windy hike, the two spend the rest of the day trying to remember what the other activities were. At night, Toad remembers the final one was "Go to sleep" and the two do so, now content.

The Garden 
Toad admires Frog's garden, and wishes to grow one of his own. After expending a considerable effort to grow his seeds, seemingly to accomplish nothing, Toad almost gives up. At the end, he realizes they're finally starting to sprout. Toad agrees that gardening is hard work.

Cookies 
Frog and Toad indulge in some home-baked cookies, but decide to use will-power to resist eating too many. Eventually they take it too far, by feeding the remainder of them to the birds.

Dragons and Giants 
After reading some adventurous stories, Frog and Toad embark on an adventure of their own by climbing a large mountain. Encountering several dangers along the way, they return home in fear, still commending each other for their bravery.

The Dream 
Toad has a dream, in which he performs several feats onstage to an audience consisting solely of Frog. However, each feat causes Frog to gradually shrink to nothing, to Toad's horror. He awakens to find Frog unharmed and normal-sized, much to his relief.

Reception 
Frog and Toad Together was a Newbery Honor Book, or runner-up for the American Library Association Newbery Medal, which recognizes the year's "most distinguished contribution to American literature for children".

Adaptations 
Frog and Toad Together was adapted into a film with Will Ryan and Hal Smith providing the voices of Frog and Toad. The first story, "A List", is not included.

References

External links

 

1972 children's books
American picture books
Newbery Honor-winning works
Books about frogs
Children's books about friendship
Picture books by Arnold Lobel
Harper & Row books